Sam Kirk, Samuel Kirk, Samantha Kirk, or similar, may refer to:

People
 Sam Kirk (born 1981; as Samantha Kirk), U.S. artist
 Samuel Kirk (1904–1996), U.S. psychologist
 Samuel Kirk (silversmith) (1793–1872), U.S. silversmith
 Tom Kirk (rugby league) (1916–1994; born Albert Samuel Kirk), Australian rugby league player
 Robert Samuel Kirk, honoured at the British 2019 Birthday Honours

Fictional characters
 George Samuel Kirk, Jr. (Star Trek), older brother of James T. Kirk, known as "Sam"

 George Samuel Kirk, Sr. (Star Trek), father of James T. Kirk and Sam Kirk

Other uses
 Samuel Kirk & Sons; a U.S. silverware company established by Samuel Kirk (silversmith)

See also

 Sam (disambiguation)
 Samuel (disambiguation)
 Samantha (disambiguation)
 Kirk (disambiguation)